The 2013 Phoenix FC season was the club's only season of existence, playing in the USL Professional Division.

USL Pro 

All times from this point on Mountain Standard Time (UTC−07:00)

Results summary

League results

Standings

U.S. Open Cup

Statistics
(Regular Season)

Goalkeepers

Transfers

Loan in

Loan out

See also 
 2013 in American soccer
 2013 USL Pro season
 Phoenix FC

References 

Phoenix FC
Phoenix Fc
Phoenix FC
Phoenix FC